This Brookings list of metropolitan economies in the United Kingdom was compiled by the Brookings Institution in Washington, D.C. and based upon the UK metropolitan areas as defined by the ESPON project of the European Union, which in turn is based on the 2001 Census. The ESPON database is the most consistent with United States definitions of metropolitan areas.

A metropolitan economy is the economy of a metropolitan area, made up of one or more cities and the surrounding suburban and rural areas to which they are closely economically tied through commuting. These areas therefore reflect a city's actual economic footprint, unconstrained by the artificial political barriers of city boundaries.

List of metropolitan economies by size

Source

List of metropolitan economies by industry sector

Source

Industry sectors
 Commodities: Agriculture, Forestry, Fishing, Hunting, Mining, Quarrying, Oil and Gas Extraction
 Manufacturing: Manufacturing
 Utilities: Utilities
 Construction: Construction
 Trade and tourism: Wholesale Trade, Retail Trade, Accommodation and Food Services
 Business and Finance: Finance and Insurance; Real Estate; Rental and Leasing; Professional, Scientific and Technical Services; Management of Companies and Enterprises
 Local/non-market services: Administrative, Support, Waste Management and Remediation Services; Educational Services; Health Care and Social Assistance; Arts, Entertainment, and Recreation; Government; Information

See also
 List of metropolitan areas in the United Kingdom
  Local enterprise partnerships

References

Bibliography
 

United Kingdom
Metropolitan areas of the United Kingdom
Metropolitan economies
United Kingdom lists by population